Victor Lindenberg Tavares Vieira (born 17 December 1997), known as Victor Lindenberg, is a Brazilian footballer who plays as a left-back for Kosovan club Dukagjini.

Club career

Early career
Lindenberg is a product of Botafogo's youth sector. He was sent out on loan to Paysandu in January 2018 until the summer. He then was loaned out once again to Marcílio Dias until the end of the year. After this loan spell, he was loaned out again, this time to Santa Cruz de Natal.

Dukagjini
On 1 December 2021, Lindenberg joined Football Superleague of Kosovo side Dukagjini. Four days later, he was named as a first team substitute for the first time in a league match against Llapi. His debut with Dukagjini came seven days later in a league match against Malisheva after being named in the starting line-up.

Career statistics

Club

References

External links

1997 births
Living people
Footballers from Rio de Janeiro (city)
Association football fullbacks
Brazilian footballers
Campeonato Brasileiro Série A players
Botafogo de Futebol e Regatas players
Campeonato Brasileiro Série B players
Paysandu Sport Club players
Clube Náutico Marcílio Dias players
Campeonato Brasileiro Série D players
Santa Cruz Futebol Clube (RN) players
Moto Club de São Luís players
Campeonato Brasileiro Série C players
Santa Cruz Futebol Clube players
Associação Atlética Anapolina players
ABC Futebol Clube players
Football Superleague of Kosovo players